HD 204018, also designated as HR 8202, is a visual binary located in the southern constellation Microscopium. The primary has an apparent magnitude of 5.58, making it faintly visible to the naked eye under ideal conditions. The companion has an apparent magnitude of 8.09. At its current distance, HD 204018's combined brightness is diminished by 0.13 magnitudes due to interstellar dust.

HD 204018A is an Am star with a stellar classification of kA4hF0 VmF6, indicating that it has the calcium K-line of an A4 star, the hydrogen lines of a F0 main-sequence star and the metallic lines of a F6 star. It has 1.65 times the mass of the Sun and 2.55 times the Sun's radius. At an age of 1.5 billion years, HD 2014018A is estimated to be on the subgiant branch. An alternate model places it on the main sequence at an age of 1,35 billion years.

The companion is an F8 main sequence star located " away along a position angle of 151°. HD 204018B is estimated to be 3.46 billion years old and is slightly metal deficent.

There is a magnitude 12 co-moving companion located 295.3" away from the system along a position angle of 75°.     It is a red dwarf with an estimated spectral class of K6 and any orbit would take over a million years.

References

Binary stars
A-type subgiants
Am stars
F-type main-sequence stars
High-proper-motion stars
Microscopium
Microscopii, 69
CD-43 14539
204018
105913
8202